Macrosteles is a leafhopper genus in the tribe Macrostelini with more than 80 species, most in the northern hemisphere. Some species are known to migrate.

Species 
 Macrosteles alpinus (Zetterstedt, 1828)
 Macrosteles bimaculatus
 Macrosteles binotata
 Macrosteles borealis
 Macrosteles chobauti Ribaut, 1952
 Macrosteles cristatus (Ribaut, 1927)
 Macrosteles empetri (Ossiannilsson, 1935)
 Macrosteles fascifrons - the aster leafhopper
 Macrosteles guttatus
 Macrosteles horvathi
 Macrosteles laevis (Ribaut, 1927)
 Macrosteles latiaedeagus 
 Macrosteles lepidus
 Macrosteles oshanini Razvyazkina, 1957
 Macrosteles parvidens
 Macrosteles quadrilineatus - the aster leafhopper
 Macrosteles slossonae
 Macrosteles tibetensis
 Macrosteles variatus
 many others.

References

External links 

 Macrosteles at bugguide.net

Cicadellidae genera
Macrostelini